Huaining County is a county in the southwest Anhui Province, People's Republic of China, under the jurisdiction of the prefecture-level city of Anqing. The government of Huaining County was originally based in Shipai (Shihpai) Town and moved to its current location in Gaohe Town on 18 January 2002.

Administrative divisions

Huaining County has jurisdiction over fifteen towns and five townships.

Towns
Gaohe, Shipai (Shihpai), Yueshan, Hongpu, Chaling, Jingong, Sanqiao, Huangdun, Jiangzhen, Xiaoshi, Lashu, Huanglong, Songling, Pingshan, Mamiao

Townships:
Liangxiang Township, Xiushan Township, Qinghe Township, Leibu Township, Shijing Township

Climate

Transport
China National Highway 318

Culture
Huaining County is noted for its Huangmeixi Opera.

Notable people
Deng Jiaxian (1924–1986) developer of the first Chinese atomic bomb and guided missile.
Hai Zi (1964–1989) well-known poet.
Chen Duxiu (1879–1942) a Chinese revolutionary socialist, educator, philosopher, author, and co-founded the Chinese Communist Party.

References

External links

County-level divisions of Anhui
Anqing